The Battle of Ordashu was a battle fought on 4 February 1874 during the Third Anglo-Ashanti War when Sir Garnet Wolseley defeated the Ashantis. The attack was led by the 42nd Regiment of Foot. Lieutenant Mark Sever Bell won the Victoria Cross during the action.

References

Ordashu
Ordashu
1874 in Africa
Ordashu
Ordashu